Lifestyle (formerly known as The LifeStyle Channel) is an Australian television channel. The channel launched on 1 September 1997. The channel has an emphasis on contemporary lifestyle interests. Its programming covers topics including food and wine, home and garden, real estate, shopping, leisure, travel and real life drama. Every Friday, articles, videos, etc., are published with new content and information regarded these topics.

Lifestyle has three subsidiary channels: Lifestyle Food, a channel dedicated to food and cooking, Lifestyle Home which is dedicated to DIY and garden advice, and Fox Arena which is dedicated to reality television and pop culture programming. Lifestyle also broadcasts other programs ranging from food, wine, home design, gardening, leisure, travel, and real life drama

On 1 March 2011 a HD simulcast of Lifestyle launched on Austar and Foxtel on channel 216.

On 19 September 2016, Lifestyle refreshed its look which included a new logo. It changed its logo once again in November 2019 as part of an overall brand refresh. The new logo was also adopted by LifeStyle Food and LifeStyle Home. In addition to this, the Fox Arena channel was placed under the Lifestyle family, whilst retaining its brand name and programming.

Programming

Current original programming
 Selling Houses Australia (2008–present)
 Grand Designs Australia (2010–present)
 Gogglebox Australia (2015–present, co-production with Network 10)
 Love It or List It Australia (2017–present)
 The Great Australian Bake Off (2013 on Nine, 2015 & 2016 on LifeStyle Food, 2018–present)
 The Repair Shop Australia (2022–present)

Former original programming
 The Best in Australia (2007)
 Chefs Christmas (2007)
 Neil Perry: High Steaks (2007)
 The Pub with One Beer (2007)
 4 Ingredients (2008)
 Brendan's Green Gift (2008)
 Dry Spell Gardening (2008)
 Bill's Holiday (2009)
 Garden Angels (2009)
 Lush House (2009)
 Matthew Hayden's Home Ground (2010)
 Donna Hay – Fast, Fresh Simple (2011)
 Relocation Relocation Australia (2011)
 Location Location Location Australia (2012-2014)
 Embarrassing Bodies Down Under (2013)
 River Cottage Australia (2013–2014; moved to LifeStyle Food in 2015)
 Paddock to Plate (2013–2014)
 Village Vets Australia (2014-2015)

Acquired programming
 Grand Designs Property Ladder Location, Location, Location Relocation, Relocation Antiques Roadshow Bargain Hunt River Cottage Extreme Fishing with Robson Green Hot Property Border Security Help! My House is Falling Down Missing Ocean Bubbles Toddlers & Tiaras''

See also 
 Lifestyle You
 Lifestyle Food
 Lifestyle Home

References

External links

Official website of Lifestyle
Official website of Lifestyle Food
Official website of Lifestyle You
Official website of Lifestyle Home

Television networks in Australia
Food and drink television
Foxtel
Television channels and stations established in 1997
1997 establishments in Australia
English-language television stations in Australia